Matiullah Jan is a senior Pakistani journalist and YouTuber.

Background
Jan has worked for several media outlets in Pakistan. He is known for his criticism of the Pakistani government.

Due to his criticism on establishment he has been allegedly threatened many times.
Matiullah Jan was sacked from Waqt News, where he was working as an anchor. This was allegedly due to pressure from security agencies. He currently runs his own YouTube channel.

Controversy 
Supreme Court of Pakistan took suo motu notice of a tweet by Jan that was critical of the judiciary, and initiated contempt proceedings against him.

Abduction and release 
In July, 2020, Jan was kidnapped from outside a public school. This school is located in Sector G-6, of Islamabad. He had gone to drop off his teacher wife there. CCTV footage showed that he was forcibly removed from his car and beaten by persons in uniform as well as plainclothes. His captors released him 12 hours later. Jan has implicated the security establishment for his kidnapping.

See also
List of kidnappings
List of solved missing person cases

References

Living people
Pakistani journalists
2010s missing person cases
July 2020 crimes in Asia
Formerly missing people
Missing person cases in Pakistan
Kidnapped people
Kidnappings in Pakistan
Year of birth missing (living people)